The Fixer is a British drama television series, produced by Kudos for ITV. Set in modern Britain, it follows the life of John Mercer, an ex-British Special Forces soldier, arrested by police for killing his aunt and uncle following his discovery of their abuse of his sister, Jess Mercer. John Mercer is released early from prison to serve in a covert state security squad as a government-backed assassin responsible for eliminating criminals and renegade police officers that the law cannot apprehend.

Main cast
Andrew Buchan as John Mercer
Peter Mullan as Lenny Douglas
Tamzin Outhwaite as Rose Chamberlain
Jody Latham as Calum McKenzie
Elisa Terren as Manuela
Liz White as Jess Mercer (Series One only)
Elliot Cowan as Matthew Symmonds (Series Two only)

Filming locations
In Episode 1 of series 1, the production team visited Kent briefly in 2007 to shoot scenes at Botany Bay in Thanet.

Episodes

Season 1 (2008)

Season 2 (2009)

Reception
The first episode received an audience of 6.65 million viewers, a 26.5% share, and episode two dropped 1.4m viewers, drawing 5.23 million, a 21.3% share of the audience. The next three episodes managed ratings of 4.75 million, 4.81 million and 4.80 million respectively. The last episode of the first series only managed 3.84 million (13.3% share), due to the episode competing against the start of a new run of Waking the Dead on BBC One which achieved double the share of that time slot.

Series one received a Royal Television Society award for Best Series.

Due to the critical acclaim and good ratings that the first series received, a second series was commissioned, which launched to 4.22 million viewers in September 2009. Series Two had disappointing ratings, dropping to as low as 2.82 million viewers by the season's end, and the show wasn't renewed for a third series.

Ratings

Series One

Series Two

Home releases
Series One was released on DVD in the UK on 21 April 2008. It contains all six episodes and a behind-the-scenes documentary. Series Two was released on 12 October 2009.

References

External links

2000s British drama television series
2008 British television series debuts
2009 British television series endings
2000s British crime television series
ITV television dramas
Television series by Banijay
English-language television shows
Television shows set in London